Alexander Belov (1951–1978) was a Soviet basketball player.

Alexander Belov or Aleksandr Belov may also refer to:

 Alexander Belov (sergeant) (1923–1980), Russian Red Army sergeant during World War II
 Aleksandr Belov (ski jumper) (born 1981), Russian ski jumper
 Aleksandr Belov (canoeist) (fl. 1980s), Soviet sprint canoer
 Alexander Potkin, also known as Alexander Belov (born 1976), Russian nationalist politician

See also
 Alexander Beglov
 Alexander Belev